Jim Courier defeated David Wheaton in the final, 4–6, 6–3, 6–4 to win the men's singles tennis title at the 1991 Miami Open.

Andre Agassi was the defending champion, but lost in the fourth round to Wheaton.

Seeds

  Stefan Edberg (semifinals)
  Boris Becker (third round)
  Andre Agassi (fourth round)
  Guy Forget (fourth round)
  Pete Sampras (second round)
  Goran Ivanišević (withdrew)
  Emilio Sánchez (quarterfinals)
  Andrés Gómez (second round)
  Brad Gilbert (second round)
  Michael Chang (fourth round)
  Andrei Cherkasov (second round)
  Jakob Hlasek (third round)
  Jim Courier (champion)
  Guillermo Pérez Roldán (second round, retired)
  Michael Stich (fourth round)
  Alexander Volkov (second round)
  Marc Rosset (quarterfinals)
  Juan Agyukera (third round)
  Karel Nováček (second round)
  Aaron Krickstein (second round)
  Sergi Bruguera (fourth round)
  Derrick Rostagno (quarterfinals)
  Henri Leconte (third round)
  Richey Reneberg (semifinals)
  Darren Cahill (third round)
  Horst Skoff (third round)
  Franco Davín (second round, retired)
  Cristiano Caratti (quarterfinals)
  Magnus Gustafsson (third round)
  Martín Jaite (second round)
  Goran Prpić (third round)
  Patrick McEnroe (fourth round)

Draw

Finals

Top half

Section 1

Section 2

Section 3

Section 4

Bottom half

Section 5

Section 6

Section 7

Section 8

References

 Main Draw

Men's Singles
Men's Singles